The first round of the Men's team kumite competition at the 2018 World Karate Championships was held on November 8th, 2018, the preliminaries and repechages on November 9th and the finals on November 11th, 2018.

Results

Finals

Repechage

Pool A

Pool B

Pool C

Pool D

References

External links
Draw

Men's team kumite